Sanussi Camará (born 24 December 1979) is a retired Bissau-Guinean football midfielder.

References

1979 births
Living people
Bissau-Guinean footballers
C.F. União de Lamas players
SC São João de Ver players
Sport Benfica e Castelo Branco players
C.D. Estarreja players

S.C. Covilhã players
C.D. Pinhalnovense players
CS Oberkorn players
Association football midfielders
Liga Portugal 2 players
Bissau-Guinean expatriate footballers
Expatriate footballers in Portugal
Bissau-Guinean expatriate sportspeople in Portugal
Expatriate footballers in Luxembourg
Bissau-Guinean expatriate sportspeople in Luxembourg